Lars Peter Berggren (born 28 March 1962 in Uddevalla, Västra Götaland) is a former Swedish Olympic swimmer. He competed at the 1980 Summer Olympics and the 1984 Summer Olympics. His best individual result was a 7th place in the men's 200 m breaststroke event in 1980.

Clubs
Skärets SS

References
sports-reference

 

1962 births
People from Uddevalla Municipality
Swedish male breaststroke swimmers
Living people
Swimmers at the 1980 Summer Olympics
Swimmers at the 1984 Summer Olympics
Olympic swimmers of Sweden
Sportspeople from Västra Götaland County